The 1972–73 Copa del Generalísimo was the 71st staging of the Spanish Cup. The competition began on 20 September 1972 and concluded on 29 June 1973 with the final.

Fourth round

|}

Fifth round

|}
Bye: Real Madrid, Athletic Bilbao, Burgos CF and Celta Vigo.

Round of 16

|}

Quarter-finals

|}

Semi-finals

|}

Final

|}

External links
 rsssf.com
 linguasport.com

Copa del Rey seasons
Copa del Rey
Copa